Jan Abaza (born March 1, 1995) is an American former tennis player of Syrian descent.

She won two singles and nine doubles titles on the ITF Circuit in her career. On August 5, 2013, she reached her best singles ranking of world No. 374. On July 20, 2015, she peaked at No. 138 in the WTA doubles rankings.

Partnering Louisa Chirico, Abaza won her first $50k tournament at the 2013 Melbourne Pro Classic, defeating Asia Muhammad and Allie Will in the final. However, she couldn't defend her title, losing in the final a year later.

ITF finals

Singles (2–1)

Doubles (9–7)

References

External links

 
 

1995 births
Living people
American female tennis players
Tennis people from New Jersey
21st-century American women